The Cyrus Wheelock House, at 200 E. 100 North in Mount Pleasant, Utah, was built around 1860.  It was listed on the National Register of Historic Places  in 1980.

It may also be known as the Madsen House.

It is located at the northeast corner of N 200 E and E 100 N.  It faces onto N 200 E.  In 1980, the street edges of the property were set off by a white picket fence. By 2016 the picket fence was gone, replaced by a solid wood fence.  And the house looks considerably transformed, including by an apparent addition on its north side.

See also
David and Evinda Madsen House, in Ephraim, also in Sanpete County and NRHP-listed

References

National Register of Historic Places in Sanpete County, Utah
Houses completed in 1860